The 2010 Donegal Senior Football Championship was contested by senior Gaelic football clubs under the auspices of Donegal GAA. Naomh Conaill were 2010 Champions, their second ever title.

Quarter-finals
The quarter-finals were played on Saturday 17 July, Saturday 24 July and Sunday 25 July.

Semi-finals

Final
Naomh Conaill won the final at MacCumhaill Park in Ballybofey. The Donegal Champions went on to reach the final of the 2010 Ulster Senior Club Football Championship, knocking out Cavan champions Kingscourt, Monaghan champions Clontibret O'Neills and Tyrone champions Coalisland along the way.

References

Donegal Senior Football Championship
Donegal Senior Football Championship